Bianca Cappello (154820 October 1587) was an Italian noblewoman who was the mistress, and afterward the second wife, of Francesco I de' Medici, Grand Duke of Tuscany. Her husband officially made her his consort. Coincidentally, the creation of the fortunate term serendipity by the writer Horace Walpole is due to a portrait of Bianca.

Biography

Bianca was born in Venice, in 1548, the daughter of Venetian nobleman Bartolomeo Cappello (1519-1594) and Pellegrina Morosini, a member of the Morosini family, one of the richest and noblest Venetian families, and was noted for her great beauty.

At the age of fifteen she fell in love with Pietro Bonaventuri, a young Florentine clerk in the firm of Salviati family, and on 28 November 1563 escaped with him to Florence, where they were married. In 1564 she had a daughter named Virginia, or, according to other sources, Pellegrina. The Venetian government made every effort to have Bianca arrested and brought back but the Grand Duke Cosimo I intervened in her favour and she was left unmolested.

However, she did not get on well with her husband's family, who were very poor and made her do menial work, until at last her beauty attracted Grand Prince Francesco, son and heir apparent of the grand duke.

Although already married to Joanna of Austria, Francesco seduced Bianca and gave her jewels, money and other presents. Bonaventuri, Bianca's husband, was given court employment and consoled himself with other ladies until, in 1572, he was murdered in the streets of Florence in consequence of some amorous intrigue. It is possible that Bianca and Francesco were involved.

On the death of Cosimo in 1574 Francesco succeeded to the grand duchy; he now installed Bianca in a palace (now known as Palazzo di Bianca Cappello) close to his own and outraged his wife by flaunting his mistress before her. At this point, Francesco had no legitimate son to inherit the duchy; a child by Bianca, though illegitimate, would be a potential heir, and by extension would secure Bianca's own position. In 1576 she duly gave birth to Don Antonio de' Medici (d. 1621), but his father, still hoping to have a legitimate son by his wife, refused to acknowledge him. Francesco and Joanna then produced a son, Grand Prince Philip de' Medici, in 1577; the child survived the perilous months of early infancy, and Bianca's hopes of being anything more than a favoured mistress seemed dashed.

Marriage

In 1578, Joanna died; a few months later Francesco secretly married Bianca, and on 10 June 1579, the marriage was publicly announced, and Antonio acknowledged as the Duke's son. Two days later, on 12 June, Bianca was crowned the Grand Duchess of Tuscany at the Palazzo Vecchio in Florence. The Venetian government now put aside its resentment and was officially represented at the magnificent wedding festivities, for it saw in Bianca Cappello an instrument for cementing good relations with Tuscany.

Bianca's position, however, was still not secure. The heir remained the young Grand Prince Philip; her own son by Francesco, though acknowledged, remained illegitimate, barred from inheriting the duchy. There would be no more children born of the relationship, and Bianca was aware that, if her husband were to die before her, she was lost, for his family, especially his brother Cardinal Ferdinand, hated her bitterly, as an adventuress and interloper.

In 1582, however, Grand Prince Philip died. Francesco immediately began working on securing the succession for his remaining son, Antonio, having him legitimated and declared heir apparent, with the support of Philip II of Spain. As the mother of the heir, Bianca's position was far stronger: even if Francesco died before Antonio reached adulthood, Bianca would have a good claim to ruling as regent on her son's behalf, and her husband's family would give her more respect as the mother of the heir.

In October 1587, at the Villa Medici in Poggio a Caiano, Francesco and Bianca died on 19 and 20 October, possibly poisoned, or as some historians believe, from malarial fever. As Bianca wasn't an official member of the Medici family, Cardinal Ferdinand did not allow her to be buried in the Medici family tombs. Instead, some believe that Bianca was buried in an unmarked mass grave under the church of St. Lorenzo, having been brought back to Florence from Poggio a Caiano. In 2006, forensic and toxicology experts at the University of Florence reported evidence of arsenic poisoning in a study published in the British Medical Journal, but in 2010 evidence of the parasite Plasmodium falciparum, which causes malaria, was found in Francesco's remains.

Depictions
The biography of Bianca Cappello was used by Thomas Middleton for his tragedy Women Beware Women (published 1657).

References

Sources
James Chater, "Bianca Cappello and Music", in Renaissance Studies in Honor of Craig Hugh Smyth (Florence, 1985), vol. i, 569–79  
Samuele Romanin, Lezioni di storia Veneta, vol. ii (Florence, 1875)
G. E. Saltini, Tragedie Medicee domestiche (Florence, 1898)
Saltini, Della morte di Francesco de' Medici e di Bianca Cappello (Florence, 1863)
Elizabeth Clementine Stedman, Bianca Capello, A Tragedy (1873)
Steegman, Bianca Cappello (Baltimore, 1913)

Rosina Wheeler Bulwer-Lytton Lytton (2010) Bianca Cappello: An Historical Romance Nabu Press

Further reading
Bax, Clifford, Bianca Cappello (London, 1927): a modern biography

External links

Medici Grand Dukes of Tuscany and their Women
Bianca Cappello at the Medici Archive Project
http://www.projectcontinua.org/bianca-capello/

|-

1548 births
1587 deaths
16th-century Venetian women
Bianca Cappello
Mistresses of Italian royalty
Grand Duchesses of Tuscany
16th-century Italian nobility
Bianca